The 2018–19 Hawaii Rainbow Warriors basketball team represented the University of Hawaiʻi at Mānoa during the 2018–19 NCAA Division I men's basketball season. The Rainbow Warriors, led by fourth-year head coach Eran Ganot, played their home games at the Stan Sheriff Center in Honolulu, Hawaii. Hawaii was a member of the Big West Conference, and participated in their 7th season in that league. They finished the season 18-13, 9-7 in Big West play. They placed fourth in the conference, losing to Long Beach State in the quarterfinals of the Big West tournament. It was the second straight year Hawaii blew a double digit lead in the tournament en route to being eliminated in the quarterfinals for the third straight year. Despite being eligible, citing health and season length, the team declined an invitation to the CIT for the second consecutive year.

Previous season
The Rainbow Warriors finished the 2017–18 season 17–13, 8–8 in Big West play to finish in sixth place. As the No. 6 seed in the Big West tournament, they were defeated by UC Irvine in the quarterfinals.

Departures

Incoming transfers

2018 Commitments

Roster

Schedule and results

|-
!colspan=9 style=| Exhibition

|-
!colspan=9 style=| Non-conference regular season

|-
!colspan=9 style=| Big West regular season

|-
!colspan=9 style=| Big West tournament

Source:

See also
2018–19 Hawaii Rainbow Wahine basketball team

References

Hawaii Rainbow Warriors basketball seasons
Hawaii
Hawaii Rainbow Warriors basketball
Hawaii Rainbow Warriors basketball